Bác Ái is a district (huyện) of Ninh Thuận province in southeastern Vietnam.

As of 2003 the district had a population of 19,631. The district capital lies at Phước Đại.

References

Districts of Ninh Thuận province